J. W. Spear and Sons was a manufacturer of board games during the 20th century. The company was founded by Jacob Wolf Spier (1832-1893) in Fürth, near Nuremberg, Germany in 1879. They initially producing goods such as table mats, photo frames, and waste-paper baskets. By the turn of the century, games had become their main product.

In 1932, the company set up a factory in Brimsdown, Enfield, Britain to avoid customs duties. With the rise to power of the Nazis and the Spier family being Jewish, some members of the family moved to Britain and subsequently Anglicised their name to Spear. The Nuremberg factory was forcibly "purchased" by a German businessman, and survived most of World War II under Nazi control until the Royal Air Force bombed it. The UK factory switched to military production during the war and then returned to making games. In 1954 the company acquired the rights to produce and market Scrabble for markets outside North America. As well as board games they made the Brickplayer construction toy.

The company was floated on the London Stock Exchange in 1966 and was taken over by Mattel in 1994 after a bidding war with Hasbro. Mattel closed the UK factory and while it still produces Scrabble, most of the traditional Spear's Games are no longer made. About 2000 old games were collected in an archive by the former chairman Francis Spear. In 2017 the UK archive was closed and the games moved to the German Games Archive in Nuremberg. They are gradually being photographed and uploaded to a database. Some are on Google Arts & Culture.

References

External links

J. W. Spear at the V&A Museum of Childhood website
Spear’s Games, Bello ring toss, ca. 1915, in the Island Historical Society Online Collections Database

Manufacturing companies established in 1879
Board game publishing companies
Companies disestablished in 1994
Defunct manufacturing companies of the United Kingdom
History of the London Borough of Enfield
Mattel subsidiaries
Toy companies of the United Kingdom
German companies established in 1879
Scrabble in the United Kingdom
Companies acquired from Jews under Nazi rule